New Hampshire elected its members March 9, 1819, after the new congress began but before the first session convened.

See also 
 1818 and 1819 United States House of Representatives elections
 List of United States representatives from New Hampshire

1819
New Hampshire
United States House of Representatives